Michael Cuffe (1694 – 24 July 1744) was an Irish Member of Parliament.

The son of Francis Cuffe by his wife Honora, daughter of Archbishop Michael Boyle, his paternal grandmother was the sister of Francis Aungier, 1st Earl of Longford. 

Michael Cuffe was born in Dublin and educated at Trinity College, Dublin. He was elected to the Irish House of Commons for County Mayo in 1719 - he resided at Ballinrobe - and then for Longford Borough in November 1727, sitting until his death. 
 
His daughter, Elizabeth, married Thomas Pakenham in 1739. Pakenham was created Baron Longford in 1756 and she was created Countess of Longford in 1785.

References

External links
 https://web.archive.org/web/20090601105535/http://www.leighrayment.com/commons/irelandcommons.htm

1744 deaths
1694 births
Alumni of Trinity College Dublin
Politicians from County Mayo
Irish MPs 1715–1727
Irish MPs 1727–1760
Place of birth missing
Members of the Parliament of Ireland (pre-1801) for County Mayo constituencies
Members of the Parliament of Ireland (pre-1801) for County Longford constituencies
Politicians from Dublin (city)